Dolichoderus curvilobus is a species of ant in the genus Dolichoderus. Described by Lattke in 1987, the species is endemic to Colombia and Costa Rica.

References

Dolichoderus
Hymenoptera of North America
Hymenoptera of South America
Insects described in 1987